Richie Worrall (born 23 September 1991) is an English motorcycle speedway rider who in 2012 reached the final of the World Under-21 Championship.

Biography
Worrall was born in St. Helens, Merseyside, the slightly elder of twins, the other being Steve Worrall, also now a speedway rider. Initially a motocross rider, he made his league debut in speedway in 2010 with Scunthorpe Saints in the National League. For 2011, he was signed by Premier League Newcastle Diamonds, with whom he won the Premier Shield, also continuing to ride in the National League with Sheffield/Scunthorpe, for whom he averaged 7.75 over a season in which the team won the league. He stayed with Newcastle in 2012, when he was joined by his brother, and also rode in the National League for Stoke Potters and in the Elite League with Lakeside Hammers.

In June 2012 he qualified for the World Under-21 Final, the first British rider to do so for three years. At the end of the month, however, a double break to his leg sustained in a crash at Workington ended his season.

Worrall spent the 2016 season with both the Glasgow Tigers and Belle Vue Aces. With Glasgow, Richie started the season fourth in the Glasgow team averages on a 6.84 Avg. Richie was a strong, consistent scorer for Glasgow both home and away, and finished the season in the number one race jacket. He led Glasgow to victory in the Premier League KO CUP final against Newcastle in October 2016. With the Aces in 2016 Richie helped his team get to the Elite League final, and most notably won a race against former World Champion Tai Woffinden, very impressive for the Aces reserve.

For the 2017 Season, Richie has only signed for the Glasgow Tigers, after promotion at Belle Vue decided that he wasn't going to be in their 2017 team-building plans.  

Richie rode for the Poole Pirates in the SGB Premiership 2019 and the Leicester Lions in the SGB Championship 2019. After a cancelled 2020 British season he signed for the Belle Vue Aces in the SGB Premiership and the Edinburgh Monarchs in the SGB Championship.

In 2022, he rode for the King's Lynn Stars in the SGB Premiership 2022 and for the Leicester Lions in the SGB Championship 2022.

In 2023, he signed for Peterborough Panthers in the SGB Premiership 2023 and Plymouth Gladiators for the SGB Championship 2023.

References

1991 births
Living people
British speedway riders
English motorcycle racers
Belle Vue Aces riders
Edinburgh Monarchs riders
Ipswich Witches riders
King's Lynn Stars riders
Lakeside Hammers riders
Newcastle Diamonds riders
Peterborough Panthers riders
Plymouth Gladiators speedway riders
Stoke Potters riders